Non-Standard Finance plc (NSF) is a UK-based consumer finance company that provides home credit under the brands Loans at Home and  Everyday Loans.  Loans at Home is the UK's third-largest provider of home credit (home-collected personal loans), and of Everyday Loans, a branch-based provider of unsecured consumer loans.

History 
NSF was established in February 2015 by John van Kuffeler, who ran home credit group Provident Financial for 22 years before retiring in December 2013. The firm was formed with £48m backing from a group of investors. NSF was listed on the London Stock Exchange in February 2015 as a cash shell, raising £100m for the acquisition of existing short-term consumer finance companies.

In August 2015, the firm acquired Loansathome4u, the home credit arm of finance group S&U, for £82.5m.

In December 2015, the firm  acquired Everyday Loans (a branch-based lending chain owned by Secure Trust Bank) for £235m. The transaction was funded by bank debt along with £160m in new equity finance.

NSF declared its first interim dividend in August 2016.

In August 2017, the firm acquired George Banco, a guarantor lender, for £53.5m.

Operations 
NSF operates in three main areas of consumer lending: home credit, guaranteed loans and branch-based unsecured lending. 
Through Loans at Home (previously Loansathome4u), it  serves approximately 98,000 customers from 40 branches in England, Wales and Scotland; and through Everyday Loans  a further 37,000 customers from approximately 40 branches in the UK.

References 

Financial services companies of the United Kingdom
British companies established in 2015
Financial services companies established in 2015
2015 establishments in the United Kingdom
Companies based in London
Companies listed on the London Stock Exchange